Put Me in Your Mix is a 1991 album by R&B singer Barry White. Regarded as a return to form, with exemplary slow jams, it was the second album of his comeback phase and contained the smash title track. The album also contained production akin to contemporary R&B, featuring electronic instrumentation and, particularly, the presence of a Linn Drum combined with White’s traditional symphonic arrangements. Glodean White sang back-up vocals, and Isaac Hayes sang duet on “Dark and Lovely (You over There).” The album reached number 98 on the Billboard Hot 100 and number 8 on the Billboard top R&B albums chart.

Track listing
 "Let's Get Busy" – 4:44
 "Love is Good with You" – 6:10
 "For Real Chill" – 5:49
 "Break it Down with You" – 6:24
 "Volare" – 5:45
 "Put Me in Your Mix" (Howard Johnson, Barry White) – 7:35
 "Who You Giving Your Love To" – 5:26
 "Love Will Find Us" – 7:07
 "We're Gonna Have it All" – 5:55
 "Dark and Lovely (You over There)" [duet with Isaac Hayes] – 10:05

International bonus track
11. "Sho' You Right" [Remix] – 8:02

Charts

Weekly charts

Year-end charts

References

1991 albums
A&M Records albums
Barry White albums